Estadio Defensores del Chaco is a multi-purpose stadium in Asunción, Paraguay. It is currently used mostly for football matches.  The stadium once had a 50,000+ capacity, however over the years the stadium has undergone remodeling, dropping the capacity to 42,354. It underwent renovations during 1939, 1996 and 2007. The stadium was again renovated in 2015. It has more than 100 years as a stadium. It is one of the places with most history in Paraguayan football. In 1960, the stadium was the venue of the first final of the Copa Libertadores. The stadium receives visits from the public from Monday to Friday from 8:30 to 12:00 and 14:00 to 16:00 with free access.

History

1910s
In February 1916, the construction of the stadium began. In November 1917, its inauguration came as the name Stadium de Sajonia, with a game between Olimpia Asunción and Libertad, won 1-0 by the latter. In 1919, Paraguay's national team played its first game in the stadium and Faustino Casado marked Paraguay's first ever goal in the stadium.

1920s
After Uruguay won the Olympic gold medal in football in 1924, the Paraguayan Football Association decided to rename the stadium "Uruguay" to honor the South American Nation. Later, the name was reverted to Estadio Puerto Sajonia. In August 1925, Paraguay's national team achieved its first victory in the stadium in a game against Uruguay in the Copa Bossio.

1930s
During the Paraguay-Bolivia Chaco War, the stadium was used as a munitions depot and troop meeting arena because of its strategic location. When the war finished, the stadium began its transformation process. It was renamed with the current name "Defensores del Chaco" (Defenders of the Chaco) in honour of the triumphant soldiers that took part in the Chaco War between Paraguay and Bolivia.

1950s
With the money obtained from winning the 1953 Copa América, a stand made out of cement and the orientation of the pitch changed from north to south.

1960s
In 1960, the stadium was the venue of the first final of the Copa Libertadores, played between Olimpia Asunción and Peñarol. In 1967, the stadium inaugurated its illumination system in a friendly encounter between Paraguay and Argentina.

1970s
In 1971, the stadium hosted the first national youth team title when Paraguay won the Torneo Juventud de América, replaced by the current South American Youth Championship. In 1972, culminated is the ampliation of the northern sector and the offices of the Asociación Paraguaya de Fútbol are moved to the stadium. In 1973, the east stand begins being constructed. In 1974, the stadium is renamed Defenders of the Chaco. In 1979, Paraguay wins the Copa América and Olimpia wins the Copa Libertadores in the stadium.

1980s
In 1983, the stadium sees the game of mayor assistance with a crowd of 49, 095 attending the Superclásico between Cerro Porteño and Olimpia Asunción.

1990s
In 1992, Paraguay's under-23 olympic team claimed the title of Pre-Olympic Tournament at the stadium. In 1999, the stadium was one of the main venues for the 1999 Copa América.

Actuality
The stadium is not owned by a team (it is a national stadium) and it is used primarily to host the home games of the Paraguay national football team and for international football club tournament games such as the Copa Libertadores and the Copa Sudamericana.

The new millennium brought modernization like construction of the VIP stalls, the ampliation of the boxes, stands and the installation of the luminic LED lights, to be at the level of the best sports stadiums in the continent.

Tenants
The Paraguay national football team plays their home fixtures at the stadium during FIFA World Cup qualifiers and international friendlies.

Local clubs such as Club Libertad, Club Guaraní and Club Olimpia often play their home games at the stadium for Primera División Paraguaya, Copa Libertadores and Copa Sudamericana fixtures.

Accidents and incidents
1 February 2009; two anti-riot police officers were killed and five injured when they were struck by a cement block that was part of the stadium.  The cement block fell from a height of seven meters.  The football match taking place during the collapse was delayed 40 minutes.

Other events

Gallery

See also
List of association football stadiums by capacity
Paraguay national football team

References

External links

Worldstadiums.com Stadium Profile 
Paraguayan Football Association Website
Stadium pictures

Football venues in Asunción
National stadiums
Sports venues in Asunción
Copa América stadiums
Multi-purpose stadiums in Paraguay
Sports venues completed in 1917